XERAM-AM is a radio station on 1310 AM in Betania, Chiapas. It is owned by La Fuente de Poder, Educativa Indígena de Chiapas, A.C.

XERAM was awarded its concession on April 27, 2016, more than a decade after the original request.

References

Radio stations in Chiapas